Showcase or vitrine may refer to:

Cabinet (furniture)
Display case

Music
Showcase (Bill Anderson album), 1964
Showcase (Patsy Cline album), 1961
Showcase (Buddy Holly album), 1964
Showcase (Philly Joe Jones album), 1959
Showcase (The Sylvers album), 1975
Showcase (Kitty Wells album), 1968
The Showcase (album), by Lead, 2016

Television
Showcase (Canadian TV channel), a Canadian cable television network
Showcase TV, a defunct UK satellite channel
Fox Showcase, an Australian TV channel
Showcase, a multiplex channel of the Showtime television network in the US
TVNZ Showcase, the arts and drama service on TVNZ 6
"The Showcase" (The Price Is Right), the final round of the game show The Price Is Right
Sky Showcase, an entertainment channel in the UK and Ireland, provided by Sky UK.

Other
Showcase (comics), a DC Comics series
Showcase (Firefox extension), an extension for Mozilla Firefox
Showcase (retailer), a North American retail company
Showcase Cinemas, a movie theater chain

See also

Showpiece
Variety show, an entertainment format showcasing a variety of acts
Vitrinite reflectance, in sedimentology, a method for identifying the maximum temperature history of sediments